Daxing is a town under the administration of Bishan District, Chongqing, China. , it has 2 residential communities and 17 villages under its administration.

References 

Township-level divisions of Chongqing